Mike Scholz (born August 6, 1988 in London, Ontario) is a Canadian international rugby union player who plays as a centre. 
He was a member of the Canadian squad at the 2011 Rugby World Cup.

References

External links

1988 births
Living people
Canada international rugby union players
Canadian rugby union players
Commonwealth Games rugby sevens players of Canada
Sportspeople from London, Ontario
Canada international rugby sevens players
Pan American Games medalists in rugby sevens
Pan American Games gold medalists for Canada
Rugby sevens players at the 2014 Commonwealth Games
Rugby sevens players at the 2011 Pan American Games
Medalists at the 2011 Pan American Games